In mathematics, Hahn series (sometimes also known as Hahn–Mal'cev–Neumann series) are a type of formal infinite series. They are a generalization of Puiseux series (themselves a generalization of formal power series) and were first introduced by Hans Hahn in 1907 (and then further generalized by Anatoly Maltsev and Bernhard Neumann to a non-commutative setting). They allow for arbitrary exponents of the indeterminate so long as the set supporting them forms a well-ordered subset of the value group (typically  or ). Hahn series were first introduced, as groups, in the course of the proof of the Hahn embedding theorem and then studied by him in relation to Hilbert's second problem.

Formulation
The field of Hahn series  (in the indeterminate ) over a field  and with value group  (an ordered group) is the set of formal expressions of the form

with  such that the support  of f is well-ordered. The sum and product of

 and 

are given by

and

For example,  is a Hahn series (over any field) because the set of rationals

is well-ordered; it is not a Puiseux series because the denominators in the exponents are unbounded.

Properties

Properties of the valued field 

The valuation  of a non-zero Hahn series

is defined as the smallest  such that  (in other words, the smallest element of the support of ): this makes  into a spherically complete valued field with value group  and residue field  (justifying a posteriori the terminology). In fact, if  has characteristic zero, then  is up to (non-unique) isomorphism the only spherically complete valued field with residue field  and value group .

Algebraic properties 

If  is an ordered field then  is totally ordered by making the indeterminate  infinitesimal (greater than 0 but less than any positive element of ) or, equivalently, by using the lexicographic order on the coefficients of the series. This fact can be used to analyse (or even construct) the field of surreal numbers (which is isomorphic, as an ordered field, to the field of Hahn series with real coefficients and value group the surreal numbers themselves).

Summable families

Summable families 

We may then define the sum  as the Hahn series

If  are summable, then so are the families , and we have

and

Evaluating analytic functions 

Indeed, the family  is always summable, so we can define . This defines a ring homomorphism .

Hahn–Witt series 

The construction of Hahn series can be combined with Witt vectors (at least over a perfect field) to form twisted Hahn series or Hahn–Witt series: for example, over a finite field K of characteristic p (or their algebraic closure), the field of Hahn–Witt series with value group Γ (containing the integers) would be the set of formal sums  where now  are Teichmüller representatives (of the elements of K) which are multiplied and added in the same way as in the case of ordinary Witt vectors (which is obtained when Γ is the group of integers). When Γ is the group of rationals or reals and K is the algebraic closure of the finite field with p elements, this construction gives a (ultra)metrically complete algebraically closed field containing the p-adics, hence a more or less explicit description of the field  or its spherical completion.

Examples
 The field of surreal numbers can be regarded as a field of Hahn series with real coefficients and value group the surreal numbers themselves.
 The field of transseries  is a directed union of Hahn fields (and is an extension of the Levi-Civita field).  The construction of  resembles (but is not literally) , .

See also 
 Rational series

Notes

References 
 
 
 
 
 
 
 
 
 

Commutative algebra
Mathematical series